Larumba of Ilam District in Nepal is a major religious site for the followers of the Kirat religion. It is situated at Mangsebung Rural Municipality, and is known for discarding the culture of animal sacrifice. Alcohol, cigarettes, tobacco, and other consumable hazards are prohibited inside the temple premises.

History
Every year during November/December, a huge festival is organized to mark the birth of Kirat Guru Atmananda Lingden. Devotees attend this ceremony wearing  white dresses. Larumba has seen remarkable growth as a town for religious tourism.

References

Tourist attractions in Nepal
Temples in Nepal